Giuseppe Maria Capece Zurlo, Theat. (3 January 1711, Monteroni di Lecce, Apulia – 31 December 1801) was an Italian cardinal who served as Archbishop of Naples.

Capece Zurlo was born in Monteroni di Lecce, Apulia, into the noble family of the princes of Zurlo. He was the son of Prince Giacomo Capece Zurlo and Ippolita Sambiase, of the princes of Campana di Portanova.

Education
He entered the Theatines, or Congregation of the Clerks Regular of the Divine Providence, and made his profession on 6 January 1727. He received the diaconate on 28 February 1733. He studied philosophy and theology in Theatine houses of study in Rome.

Priesthood
He was ordained on 19 December 1733. In his order he served as lector of philosophy, at the House of the Santi Apostoli, for nine years; and as lector of theology, minister, consultor, vice-provost and lector of philosophy, in the House of San Silvestro, Rome. When he was about to be elected procurator general in 1756, the pope appointed him Bishop of Calvi, on 24 May 1756; he was consecrated three days later.

Cardinalate
He was created cardinal and promoted to the metropolitan see of Naples on 16 December 1782, and was installed as Cardinal Priest of San Bernardo alle Terme on 17 February 1783. He was decorated by King Ferdinand IV of Sicily with the grand cross of the Sacred Military Constantinian Order of Saint George in 1783 and was named Knight of the Order of Saint Januarius in 1790.

In 1799 he tried to avoid the popular uprising encouraged by the Sanfedismo revolt organized by Cardinal Fabrizio Ruffo against the French Revolutionary army of General Championnet. He did not participate in the Papal conclave, 1799-1800, which elected Pope Pius VII.

Death
He died on 31 December 1801 at the monastery of Monte Vergine, Naples.

References

External links
 Catholic Hierarchy: career summary 

1711 births
1801 deaths
People from the Province of Lecce
17th-century Italian Roman Catholic archbishops
Theatines
Archbishops of Naples
18th-century Italian Roman Catholic archbishops